Patrick Crowley (born 1947) is an Irish retired hurler who played for Cork Championship club Newcestown and divisional side Carbery. He played for the Cork senior hurling team for two seasons, during which time he usually lined out as a right wing-back.

Crowley began his hurling career at club level with Newcestown. He broke onto the club's top adult team in the mid-1960s and enjoyed his first success in 1972 when the club won the Cork Junior Championship. Crowley won a second Cork Junior Championship medal in 1980. He made numerous championship appearances in two different grades of hurling for the club, while his early prowess also saw him selected for the Carbery divisional team.

At inter-county level, Crowley first came to prominence at midfield on the Cork minor team during the 1965 Munster Championship. After failing to secure a place on the Cork under-21 team, he joined the Cork senior team in 1971. Crowley was a regular member of the team for two seasons and played his last game in 1972. During that time he was part of the 1972 Munster Championship-winning team. Crowley also won a National Hurling League medal in 1972.

Honours

Newcestown
Cork Junior Hurling Championship (2): 1972, 1980
South West Junior A Hurling Championship (5): 1967, 1969, 1972, 1979, 1980

Cork
Munster Senior Hurling Championship (1): 1972
National Hurling League (1): 1971-72

References

1947 births
Living people
Newcestown hurlers
Carbery hurlers
Cork inter-county hurlers
Hurling backs